

J06A Immune sera

J06AA Immune sera
J06AA01 Diphtheria antitoxin
J06AA02 Tetanus antitoxin
J06AA03 Snake venom antiserum
J06AA04 Botulinum antitoxin
J06AA05 Gas-gangrene sera
J06AA06 Rabies serum

J06B Immunoglobulins

J06BA Immunoglobulins, normal human
J06BA01 Immunoglobulins, normal human, for extravascular administration
J06BA02 Immunoglobulins, normal human, for intravascular administration

J06BB Specific immunoglobulins
J06BB01 Anti-D (rh) immunoglobulin
J06BB02 Tetanus immunoglobulin
J06BB03 Varicella/zoster immunoglobulin
J06BB04 Hepatitis B immunoglobulin
J06BB05 Rabies immunoglobulin
J06BB06 Rubella immunoglobulin
J06BB07 Vaccinia immunoglobulin
J06BB08 Staphylococcus immunoglobulin
J06BB09 Cytomegalovirus immunoglobulin
J06BB10 Diphtheria immunoglobulin
J06BB11 Hepatitis A immunoglobulin
J06BB12 Encephalitis, tick-borne immunoglobulin
J06BB13 Pertussis immunoglobulin
J06BB14 Morbilli immunoglobulin
J06BB15 Parotitis immunoglobulin
J06BB19 Anthrax immunoglobulin
J06BB30 Combinations

J06BC Antibacterial monoclonal antibodies
J06BC01 Nebacumab
J06BC02 Raxibacumab
J06BC03 Bezlotoxumab
J06BC04 Obiltoxaximab

J06BD Antiviral monoclonal antibodies
J06BD01 Palivizumab
J06BD02 Motavizumab
J06BD03 Tixagevimab and cilgavimab
J06BD04 Ansuvimab
J06BD05 Sotrovimab
J06BD06 Regdanvimab
J06BD07 Casirivimab and imdevimab
J06BD08 Nirsevimab

See also
 Immune sera and immunoglobulins for veterinary use are in the ATCvet group QI.

References

J06